Jolina Sings the Masters is the fourth studio album by Filipino singer-actress Jolina Magdangal released by Star Music on August 15, 2002. The album consists of 15 songs mostly ballads, with some come with a light pop lilt. The album's title refers to the songwriters who contributed songs to the collection, whose works have become contemporary classics in Philippine music industry earning them the right to be referred to as masters. The album took eight months to finish due to Magdangal's concert tours around the Philippines and in major cities around the world.

The album showcased the transition of Magdangal from a youth kiddie pop to a grown-up artist, getting rid of the colorful wardrobe, hair ribbons and her trademark bangs and exploring adult emotions in the songs.

The first single released from the album was "Kahit Di Mo Pansin", composed by Vehnee Saturno. Other notable pieces include her covers of "Million Miles Away", which she performed live in the 2003 Asian Television Awards; "Kahit Ika'y Panaginip Lang", which was used in her television series Kahit Kailan; "How Will I Know", which was personally written by David Pomeranz for her; and "No Letting Go", which she and composer Trina Belaminde collaborated in the song's concept.

Critical reception
The album was praised for its repertoire particularly on putting up together master composers in a single album, making it the first album to do such.

Commercial performance
The album was awarded with a gold record certification from the Philippine Association of the Record Industry (PARI).

Track listing

Personnel 
Adapted from the Jolina Sings the Masters liner notes.

 Vilma B. Selga & Charo Santos-Concio – executive producers
 Andrei Dionisio – a&r supervision
 Beth Faustino & Mona Quejano – a&r coordinators
 Jolina Magdangal & Jun Magdangal – album cover concept
 Raymund del Rosario – album packaging concert & art director
 Ferdinand Abuel & Redel Dapul – creative coordinators
 Tom Epperson – photography
 Jenni Epperson – styling
 Jing Monis & Krist Bansuelo – make-up
 Joel Soriano – cover design & layout

References

2002 albums
Jolina Magdangal albums